Emilios Hatjoullis (born 7 September 1939) is a British cartoonist and graphic designer. During the 1960s he was a designer at the Blackpool Pleasure Beach and at the Blackpool Illuminations. His works include the tableaux displays of nursery rhymes such as 'Hickory Dickory Dock' and 'Mary, Mary, Quite Contrary', which are still exhibited during the light festival in the autumn. At the Blackpool Pleasure Beach Emilios Hatjoullis helped with the design the psychedelic Candy House and the redesign of the Noah's Ark from its dated 1920s style.

At the end of the 1960s Emilios Hatjoullis went to become creative director at Brunning's advertising agency in Liverpool. For the local Higsons brewery he created a series of characters called the 'Old Higsonians' named after Liverpool landmarks such as Albert Dock, Penny Lane, and Ann Field. However, in 1985 the Higson's brewery was bought out by Boddingtons of Manchester and the ad campaign was stopped, leaving a limited number of collectible breweriana merchandise.

Emilios Hatjoullis now works for the Beano comic illustrating the infantile thief Baby Face Finlayson and is pursuing his love of painting and fine art.
His style was used for a few Dennis The Menace strips in 2002, but it's not known if it actually was him. He drew Baby Face Finlayson between 2004 and 2007 for the comic, and had drawn Merboy a few times too.

External links
 Examples of some of the Old Higsonian characters: Old Higsonians
 History and images of the Blackpool Illuminations: The Lights
 Visit Baby Face and other Beano characters: Beano Town

References

1939 births
Living people
People from Blackpool
English cartoonists